Sergey Belykh (born 4 March 1990) is a Russian cyclist, who last rode for Russian amateur team Udmurtia Region.

Major results

2010
 10th Overall Grand Prix of Adygeya
2011
 5th Overall Ronde de l'Isard
2012
 1st Stage 2 Troféu Joaquim Agostinho
 3rd Overall Vuelta Ciclista a León
1st  Young rider classification
2014
 1st Overall Tour de Constantine
1st Points classification
 1st  Mountains classification Course de la Solidarité Olympique
 2nd Overall Tour International de Sétif
1st Stage 3
 2nd Overall Tour of Kavkaz
 7th Overall Grand Prix of Adygeya
2015
 2nd Grand Prix Sarajevo
 4th Grand Prix of Sochi Mayor
 5th Overall Tour of Bulgaria
 8th Overall Grand Prix of Adygeya
 8th Giro del Medio Brenta

References

External links

1990 births
Living people
Russian male cyclists
Place of birth missing (living people)